Gun laws in Louisiana regulate the sale, possession, and use of firearms and ammunition in the state of Louisiana in the United States.

Summary table

Louisiana gun laws
Louisiana is a "shall issue" state for concealed carry. The Louisiana Department of Public Safety and Corrections shall issue a concealed handgun permit to qualified applicants, after performing an NICS background check and giving the local police 10 days to provide additional information about the applicant. An applicant must demonstrate handgun proficiency by taking a training course from an approved instructor, or by having been trained while serving in the military. Concealed carry is not permitted in any portion of the permitted area of an establishment that has been granted a class A-General retail permit, to sell alcoholic beverages for consumption on the premises, or in any place of worship, government meeting place, courthouse, police station, polling place, parade, or in certain other locations.

Open carry of firearms in Louisiana is permitted without a permit, as long as the user is of at least 18 years of age and legally able to possess a firearm under state and federal law.

Louisiana has state preemption of firearms laws, except for local laws passed before July 15, 1985. Government bodies other than the state may not sue firearms manufacturers, dealers, or trade associations for damages that are the result of lawful activities. St. Mary Parish has adopted a Second Amendment sanctuary resolution.

See also
 Law of Louisiana

References

Louisiana law
Louisiana